Scott Patterson (born January 28, 1992) is an American cross-country skier. He competed in the 2018 Winter Olympics and 2022 Winter Olympics. He skied for South Anchorage High School, where he was a three-time Alaska State skimeister. He then skied for the University of Vermont along with his sister, Caitlin. Currently, he represents Alaska Pacific University professionally and the US Ski Team. Most recently, he placed 10th at the World Championships 50k Classic race in Obersdorf, Germany.

Cross-country skiing results
All results are sourced from the International Ski Federation (FIS).

Olympic Games

Distance reduced to 30 km due to weather conditions.

World Championships

World Cup

Season standings

Team podiums
1 victory – (1 ) 
1 podium – (1 )

References

External links

1992 births
Living people
Cross-country skiers at the 2018 Winter Olympics
Cross-country skiers at the 2022 Winter Olympics
American male cross-country skiers
Olympic cross-country skiers of the United States
University of Vermont alumni
Vermont Catamounts skiers
21st-century American people